Tapasya is a 1976 Indian Hindi-language romantic drama film produced by Tarachand Barjatya for Rajshree Productions. The film is directed by Anil Ganguly, based on story by veteran Bengali novelist Ashapurna Devi. The film stars Raakhee, Parikshat Sahni, Lalita Pawar, Nazir Hussain, A. K. Hangal, and Asrani. The film's music is by Ravindra Jain. It won the National Film Award for Best Popular Film Providing Wholesome Entertainment for the year.  It was remade in Telugu as Sandhya in 1980 starring Sujatha in the title role.

Cast
Shubhari Devi as Shubham Kaushik
Raakhee as Indrani Sinha
Parikshit Sahni as Dr. Sagar Varma
Asrani as Vinod Sinha
A. K. Hangal as Chandranath Sinha
Gayatri as Chanda Sinha
Nazir Hussain as Professor Sinha
Manju Bhatia as Pinky
Om Shivpuri as Pinky's father
Sunder as Chacha
Lalita Kumari as Chachi
Birbal as Chacha's son
Viju Khote as Gopi
Lalita Pawar as Mrs. Varma
Manju Asrani
Urmila Bhatt
C. S. Dubey

Music

Awards

 24th Filmfare Awards:

Won

 Best Actress – Raakhee

Nominated

 Best Film – Rajshri Productions
 Best Story – Ashapoorna Devi

23rd National Film Awards:

 National Film Award for Best Popular Film Providing Wholesome Entertainment – Anil Ganguly

References

External links
 

1976 films
Indian drama films
1970s Hindi-language films
Rajshri Productions films
Hindi films remade in other languages
Films scored by Ravindra Jain
Best Popular Film Providing Wholesome Entertainment National Film Award winners
Films directed by Anil Ganguly
1976 drama films
Hindi-language drama films